The Pointe des Mossettes (2,277 m) is a mountain of the Chablais Alps, overlooking Les Crosets in the Swiss canton of Valais. The French border runs west of the summit on a straight line, although the mountain lies on the main watershed between the Dranse river basin and the Val d'Illiez.

The mountain is part of the international ski area Portes du Soleil and its summit can be reached by cable car from Les Crosets or Avoriaz (France).

See also
List of mountains of Switzerland accessible by public transport

References

External links
 Pointe des Mossettes on Hikr

Mountains of the Alps
Mountains of Valais
Mountains of Switzerland
Two-thousanders of Switzerland